The Delamater-Bevin Mansion, also known as The Bevin House, is a historic 22-room Victorian mansion on the north shore of Long Island within the Incorporated Village of Asharoken, New York.  The estate is on the Eatons Neck landmass on the edge of Duck Island Harbor, an inlet of Northport Bay, off of Long Island Sound.

History 

The home was built by Cornelius Henry DeLamater in 1862 in French Second Empire architectural style, and was originally known as Vermland. The turret, engines, and weaponry on the Ironclad "Monitor" were built by DeLamater's foundry under the direction of noted marine engineer John Ericsson. DeLamater named his summer estate "Vermland" after the Swedish province where Ericsson was born as the two men were best of friends and inseparable. After DeLamater's death on February 7, 1889, his Eaton's Neck estate was inherited by his wife Ruth Oakley Caller DeLamater, who died on December 7, 1894, leaving the estate to their daughter Laura DeLamater Bevin. Over time, the house gradually became known as "The Bevin House. Laura DeLamater Bevin died on March 4, 1920 and her son Sydney Bevin inherited the property.

During World War II, the exiled French writer and pioneering aviator Antoine de Saint-Exupéry rented The Bevin House, which is where he wrote much of the well-known novel The Little Prince during late 1942.  He lived there with Consuelo de Saint-Exupéry, and they hosted their common friend Denis de Rougemont.

On May 29, 1960 Sydney Bevin died, and The Bevin House was sold to Charles William Foesell in 1964.  In 1979 the estate was purchased by real estate developer Nikos Kefalidis, who commissioned an  extensive restoration of the mansion. Kefalidis was killed in the crash of Swiss Air 111 on September 2, 1998.

The Delamater-Bevin Mansion was added to the National Register of Historic Places in 1985.

See also 

 The Little Prince

References 

 Footnotes 

 Citations

External links 
 Official website of Antoine de Saint-Exupery

Houses on the National Register of Historic Places in New York (state)
Mansions of Gold Coast, Long Island
Huntington, New York
Houses in Suffolk County, New York
Antoine de Saint-Exupéry
1862 establishments in New York (state)
National Register of Historic Places in Suffolk County, New York